Pseudomicrophyllium geryon is a species of phasmid or leaf insect. It is found in the Philippines, Java (Indonesia), and Sri Lanka.

References

Phasmatodea
Insects of Indonesia
Insects of the Philippines
Insects of Sri Lanka
Insects described in 1843
Taxa named by George Robert Gray